Cáceres Club Baloncesto also known as Cáceres CB was a basketball club based in Cáceres, Spain. It was founded in 1961.

History

Cáceres CB club participated in  11 ACB League (from 1992 to 2003) and in two editions of the LEB (2003–04 and 2004–05). The club disappeared at the end of 2004-05 season when it was playing in the LEB League because of its financial problems.

The most important achievement of Cáceres CB were the semifinals of the Korać Cup in 1995 and finishing as runner-up of the Copa del Rey in 1997.

Season by season

Trophies and awards

Trophies
Copa Extremadura: (1)
2001

Notable players
 Pepe Arcega
 Juan Antonio Orenga
 José Antonio Paraíso
  Johnny Rogers
 Danya Abrams
 Raymond Brown
 Kevin Pritchard
 Rod Sellers
 Nebojša Ilić

External links

Cáceres C.B. in ACB.com
Cáceres C.B. in basketpedya.com

Defunct basketball teams in Spain
Former Liga ACB teams
Former LEB Oro teams
Basketball teams disestablished in 2005
Basketball teams established in 1961
Basketball teams in Extremadura
Sport in Cáceres, Spain